Dino Špehar (born 8 February 1994) is a Croatian professional footballer who plays as a forward for Slovenian PrvaLiga side Olimpija Ljubljana.

Club career

Osijek
Špehar started his career playing at youth level for his hometown club Osijek. Before he signed a professional three-year contract with Osijek in October 2010, Špehar scored over 300 goals in his appearances for Osijek's youth categories. He made his debut for the first team in a cup game against Šibenik on 27 October 2010, when he replaced Vedran Nikšić for the final ten minutes of the match. On his first appearance for Osijek in Prva HNL, he scored his first league goal, a late equalizer against Slaven Belupo. In the second leg of Croatian Cup quarter-finals against Dinamo Zagreb, Špehar scored the opening goal but Osijek lost 3–1 and was eliminated with an aggregate score 5–1.

Dinamo Zagreb
On 25 August 2011, it was announced that Špehar signed a seven-year contract with Croatian powerhouse Dinamo Zagreb.

RNK Split
In June 2015, Špehar terminated his contract with Dinamo Zagreb and signed a three-year contract with RNK Split.

International career
Špehar was a part of the Croatian under-17 team in the qualifications for the 2011 UEFA European Under-17 Championship and scored four goals in six games. Although Croatia finished the qualifiers undefeated, they finished as runners-up in the elite round in the group behind hosts Netherlands and failed to qualify.

Personal life
His father is Robert Špehar, a former Croatian international footballer and the former chairman of NK Osijek.

Career statistics

Honours
Dunărea Călărași
Liga II: 2017–18

References

External links
 
 
 

1994 births
Living people
Sportspeople from Osijek
Association football forwards
Association football midfielders
Croatian footballers
Croatia youth international footballers
Croatia under-21 international footballers
NK Osijek players
GNK Dinamo Zagreb players
NK Lokomotiva Zagreb players
NK Istra 1961 players
RNK Split players
CFR Cluj players
CS Concordia Chiajna players
FC Dunărea Călărași players
FK Kukësi players
ŠKF Sereď players
NK Olimpija Ljubljana (2005) players
NK Aluminij players
Croatian Football League players
Liga I players
Liga II players
Kategoria Superiore players
Slovak Super Liga players
Slovenian PrvaLiga players
Croatian expatriate footballers
Expatriate footballers in Romania
Expatriate footballers in Albania
Expatriate footballers in Slovakia
Expatriate footballers in Slovenia
Croatian expatriate sportspeople in Romania
Croatian expatriate sportspeople in Albania
Croatian expatriate sportspeople in Slovakia
Croatian expatriate sportspeople in Slovenia